Eddy Zervigon (Nace 07 De Julio De 1940) Güines, Cuba is a Cuban flautist and bandleader. He was born in Guines, Cuba but moved to the United States in 1962, where he founded the charanga band Orquesta Broadway with his brothers Rudy and Kelvin. The lead singer was Roberto Torres. A very successful band, Orquesta Broadway toured Africa and Europe.

References

Living people
1940 births
Cuban flautists
Cuban emigrants to the United States